Pietro Mansueto Ferrari (28 July 1823, Novi Ligure – 15 June 1893, Crosio, Alessandria) was an Italian entomologist who specialised in Hemiptera, particularly Auchenorrhyncha. 
He is not to be confused with Johann Angelo Ferrari also an entomologist.

Pietro Ferrari was a physician. 
He wrote:
Cicadaria agri ligustici. Annali del Museo Civico di Storia Naturales di Genova 18: 75-165 (1882)
Materiali per lo studio della fauna Tunisina raccoltida G. e L. Doria. Annali del Museo Civico di Storia Naturales di Genova. 1: 439-522 (1884)
Rincoti omotteri raccolti nell'Italia centrale e meridionale dal Prof. G. Cavanna. Bullettino della Societá Entomologica Italiana. Firenze. 17: 269-92 (1885)
Elenco dei rincoti Sardi che si trovano nella collezione del Museo Civico di Genova. Annali del Museo Civico di Storia Naturales di Genova. 6: 545-70 (1888)
Res ligusticae XIX. Elenco dei rincoti ligustici (Emitteri e Cicadarii) fin'ora osservati. Annali del Museo Civico di Storia Naturales di Genova. 12: 549-576
and many other works describing new species. His collection including all his types is conserved in the Museo Civico di Storia Naturale di Genova

References
Wilderman, M. 1894. Ferrari, Professor. Jahrbuch Naturwissenschaften 9:503.
Gestro, R. 1893. Pietro Mansueto Ferrari. Annali del Museo Civico di Storia Naturale di Genova 33:407-416.

Italian entomologists
1823 births
1893 deaths
People from Novi Ligure